This is a list of Africanists.

See also 
 African studies
 Lists of people by occupation

Africanists